The Rural Municipality of Winchester is a former rural municipality (RM) in the Canadian province of Manitoba. It was originally incorporated as a rural municipality on November 1, 1890. It ceased on January 1, 2015 as a result of its provincially mandated amalgamation with the Town of Deloraine to form the Municipality of Deloraine – Winchester.

The former RM is located in the southwestern part of the province, on its border with the state of North Dakota in the United States. It had a population of 594 in the 2006 census.

Geography 
According to Statistics Canada, the former RM had an area of 725.58 km2 (280.15 sq mi). A portion of Manitoba's Turtle Mountain Provincial Park is located at the southeast corner of the former RM along its border with North Dakota.

Communities 
 Dand
 Mountainside
 Regent

Adjacent municipalities 
Rural Municipality of Brenda - (west)
Rural Municipality of Cameron - (north)
Rural Municipality of Morton - (east)
Bottineau County, North Dakota - (south)

References 

 Manitoba Historical Society - Rural Municipality of Winchester

External links 
 
 Map of Winchester R.M. at Statcan

Winchester
Populated places disestablished in 2015
2015 disestablishments in Manitoba